is a Japanese multi-media franchise by Takara Tomy that includes a dice game, manga series, an anime television series and a video game for the Nintendo 3DS.  It is similar to Takara's earlier Battle Beasts toyline.

Characters

Anime
On September 4, 2012 Japanese book publisher Shueisha announced the franchise would receive an anime television adaptation. The series, produced by SynergySP, premiered on TV Tokyo on January 13, 2013 at 8:44 a.m. It ran for thirty-eight 11-minute episodes in a half hour block shared with B-Daman Fireblast, which both concluded on September 29, 2013. Similar to SynergySP's Beyblade: Shogun Steel, Beast Saga'''s internet streaming and international versions were released as twenty-six 22-minute episodes. Two 11-minute episodes were merged into a 22-minute one and included the addition of seven unreleased episodes, which were previously announced as a second season.

In 2014, voice actress Erin Fitzgerald listed Beast Saga'' on her resume. An English version of the show premiered on Toonami Asia on April 19, 2015. The English dub is recorded in Hong Kong. On February 24, 2021, Cinedigm announced they would stream the series on their CONtv service in North America. The English dub became available at an undisclosed date. It also became available on Cineverse.

Episodes

References

External links

2010s toys
2012 manga
2013 anime television series debuts
Action figures
Manga series
Shueisha franchises
Shueisha manga
Takara Tomy
Takara Tomy franchises
TV Tokyo original programming
Animated television series about animals
Shōnen manga